In Greek mythology, Tereus (Ancient Greek: Τηρεύς) was a Thracian king, the son of Ares and the naiad Bistonis. He was the brother of Dryas. Tereus was the husband of the Athenian princess Procne and the father of Itys.

Mythology 
When Tereus desired his wife's sister, Philomela, he came to Athens to his father-in-law Pandion to ask for his other daughter in marriage, stating that Procne had died. Pandion granted him the favour, and sent Philomela and guards along with her. But Tereus threw the guards into the sea, and finding Philomela on a mountain, forced himself upon her. He then cut her tongue out and held her captive so she could never tell anyone. After he returned to Thrace, Tereus gave Philomela to King Lynceus and told his wife that her sister had died. Philomela wove letters in a tapestry depicting Tereus's crime and sent it secretly to Procne. Lynceus' wife Lathusa who was a friend of Procne, at once sent the concubine (Philomela) to her. 

When Procne recognized her sister and knew the impious deed of Tereus, the two planned to return the favour to the king. Meanwhile, it was revealed to Tereus by prodigies that death by a relative's hand was coming to his son Itys. When he heard this, thinking that his brother Dryas was plotting his son's death, he killed the innocent man. Procne, however, killed her son Itys by Tereus, served his flesh in a meal at his father's table in revenge, and fled with her sister.

When Tereus learned of the crime she had done, he pursued the sisters and tried to kill them but all three were changed by the Olympian Gods into birds out of pity: Tereus became a hoopoe or a hawk; Procne became the swallow whose song is a song of mourning for the loss of her child; Philomela became the nightingale. Incidentally, the female nightingale has no song. (Hyginus, Fabulae, 45).

A very similar story was told about Polytechnus.

Other usage 
Tereus was also a common given name among Thracians.

The Attic playwrights Sophocles and Philocles both wrote plays entitled Tereus on the subject of the story of Tereus.

Shakespeare refers to Tereus in Titus Andronicus, after Chiron and Demetrius have raped Lavinia and cut out her tongue and also both her hands. He also makes reference to Tereus in Cymbeline, when Iachimo spies upon the sleeping Imogen to gather false evidence so he can persuade Posthumus he has seduced her.

The transformed Tereus is a character in The Birds by Aristophanes.

Modern adaptations
The Love of the Nightingale, play by Timberlake Wertenbaker
The Love of the Nightingale, opera by Richard Mills to a libretto from the above play

References

External links 
 The New Tereus by Robert Lalonde

Children of Ares
Mythological kings of Thrace
Kings in Greek mythology
Metamorphoses into birds in Greek mythology
Greek mythology of Thrace
Mythological rapists